Tazeh Ran (also Romanized as Tāzeh Rān, Tāzehrān, and Tāzīrān; also known as Tārzan) is a village in Japelaq-e Sharqi Rural District, Japelaq District, Azna County, Lorestan Province, Iran. At the 2006 census, its population was 207, in 55 families.

References 

Towns and villages in Azna County